Esentepe (literally meaning  “Breezing hill”) is a village located in the Girne District of Cyprus, east of Girne. It is under the de facto control Northern Cyprus.

The village got its name from Saint Ambrose where a church is dedicated to his name and had one of the largest churches of Cyprus, built in 1910. The church of Saint Ambrose has been now converted into a mosque.
Saint Ambrose is numbered among the Saints of Cyprus and had come from Palestine with Saint Epictitus, who gave his name to Agios Epiktitos and other monks chased by the Saracens. Saint Epiktitos lived as an ascetic twenty-seven kilometers to the west and Saint Ambrose lived as an ascetic monk in this area. In the confusion of time instead of honouring Saint Ambrose the local ascetic who became a Saint in Cyprus, some started to honour the more widely known Doctor of the Church Saint Ambrose, bishop of Milan . In Cyprus, the replacement Cypriot Saints with other more known Saints bearing the same name is now a common phenomenon, apparently due to ignorance. Whatever the case, today the survivors of the village honour Saint Ambrose, the bishop of Milan who lived in the fourth century, who is a common Saint for both the Eastern and Western Church. However, Saint Ambrose of Milan has no direct relationship with this region or Cyprus generally and the tradition of the island does not link this Saint with the local lore, which links them with the local, Saint Ambrose of Cyprus.

The local Saint Ambrose and not Saint of Ambrose of Milan, knew Saint Demitrianos, who lived during the 9th century. At that time Saint Demitrianos was bishop of Chytroi (present day Kythrea). Saint Ambrose sent him by mule drivers hot coals in baskets, Saint Dimitrianos, in return, sent him water from Kephalovryso of Kythrea in baskets as well, which caused the surprise of the villagers.

Another local legend  involving Ayios Amvrosios involves St Demitrianus. In the far horizon you can see the small rock-island in the Kyrenian sea. According to legend there was a sea-beast terrorising the villagers of Ayios Amvrosios. They asked for Ayios Demetrianos help and Ayios Demetrianos transformed the sea-beast into that rock-island. The rock-island is called "shiros" or "katsoshiros"and the area there is called also "shiros". A small seaside chapel was built in honor of St Demitrianus.

The memory of the local Saint Ambrose of Cyprus is not celebrated anymore.

Turkish Cypriot Agios Amvrosios municipality was founded in 1980.

Culture, sports, and tourism
Turkish Cypriot Esentepe Sports Club was founded in 1975, and now in Cyprus Turkish Football Association (CTFA) K-PET 1st League.

The town also has a golf course together with many shops, restaurants, bars, a Health Centre and Pharmacy.  There are 5 AED defibrillators positioned along the main road.

The Esentepe Beach is currently undergoing major development which will include log cabins, restaurant and beach bar.

International relations

Twin towns – sister cities
Agios Amvrosios is twinned with:
 Kartal, Istanbul, Turkey

References

Communities in Kyrenia District
Populated places in Girne District
Greek Cypriot villages depopulated during the 1974 Turkish invasion of Cyprus
Municipalities of Northern Cyprus